The 1940–41 Oshkosh All-Stars season was the All-Stars' fourth year in the United States' National Basketball League (NBL), which was also the fourth year the league existed. Seven teams competed in the NBL in 1940–41, and for the first time the league did not use divisions.

The All-Stars played their home games at South Park School Gymnasium. For the fourth consecutive season, the All-Stars finished the season with either a division or league best record (18–6). They then went on to win their first league championship after having lost in the finals the previous three seasons.

Head coach George Hotchkiss won the league's Coach of the Year Award. Players Leroy Edwards and Charley Shipp earned First Team All-NBL honors.

Roster

Note: Pete Hecomovich was not on the playoffs roster

Regular season

Season standings

Playoffs

Semifinals
(1) Oshkosh All-Stars vs. (3) Akron Firestone Non-Skids: Oshkosh wins series 2–0
Game 1 @ Akron: Oshkosh 30, Akron 28
Game 2 @ Oshkosh: Oshkosh 47, Akron 41(OT)

NBL Championship
(1) Oshkosh All-Stars vs. (2) Sheboygan Red Skins: Oshkosh wins series 3–0
Game 1 @ Sheboygan: Oshkosh 53, Sheboygan 38
Game 2 @ Oshkosh: Oshkosh 44, Sheboygan 38
Game 3 @ Oshkosh: Oshkosh 54, Sheboygan 36

Awards and honors
 NBL Coach of the Year – George Hotchkiss
 First Team All-NBL – Leroy Edwards and Charley Shipp

References

Oshkosh All-Stars seasons
Oshkosh
National Basketball League (United States) championship seasons
Oshkosh All-Stars
Oshkosh All-Stars